was a Japanese water polo player who competed in the 1968 Summer Olympics and in the 1972 Summer Olympics.

References

1942 births
2006 deaths
Japanese male water polo players
Olympic water polo players of Japan
Water polo players at the 1968 Summer Olympics
Water polo players at the 1972 Summer Olympics
20th-century Japanese people
21st-century Japanese people